Magadi, Kenya is a town in the Kenya Rift Valley at Lake Magadi, located southwest of Nairobi, in southern Kenya. Magadi is northeast of Lake Natron in Tanzania.

Magadi township lies on Lake Magadi's east shore, and is home to the Magadi Soda Company, now owned by Tata India. This factory produces soda ash, which has a range of industrial uses. Magadi is the central town of Magadi division of the Kajiado County.

Magadi has gained organized access to the Internet, and computer usage, through the United Nations Development Programme-Kenya for solar-powered laptop computers, begun in July 2002: by the end of 2003, about 10,000 residents (48%) had visited the five E-Centers for Internet computer access, developed by the UN project.

Magadi was a filming location for Fernando Meirelles's film The Constant Gardener, which is based on the book of the same name by John le Carré, although in the film, the shots are supposed to be at Lake Turkana, which are actually at Lake Magadi.

Notes

External links 
 Photo of Great Rift Valley: showing vegetation and desert [full web page from PBase.com].

Populated places in Kajiado County